The  is a rapid transit system in Osaka, Japan, operated by Osaka Metro. The line runs east-westerly under . Station numbers are indicated by the letter C.

Together with the through operation to the Keihanna Line, the two lines have a unified nickname .

The section became a part of the Chūō Line, however is still owned by OTS.

The Chūō Line is the only line to connect to all other railway lines operated by the Osaka Municipal Transportation Bureau, including the Nankō Port Town Line.

History
The line (initially known as Line No. 4) opened on December 11, 1961, initially running between Ōsakakō and Bentenchō (this was the first elevated portion of the Osaka subway system); trains were initially composed of one car. Between 1964 and 1985, the line was expanded towards Nagata in four stages:
31 October 1964: Section between Bentenchō and Hommachi opens, with intermediate stations at Kujo and Awaza.
30 September 1967: The section between Tanimachi 4-chome and Morinomiya opens as a shuttle service with 2-car trains.
29 July 1968: The section of the shuttle service between Morinomiya and Fukaebashi opens.
6 December 1969: The section between Hommachi and Tanimachi 4-chome (including Sakaisuji-Hommachi) opens after construction delays; the shuttle service between Tanimachi 4-chome and Fukaebashi was absorbed into the line, which was now named the Chūō Line. 4-car trains begin operation.
5 April 1985: The section between Fukaebashi and Nagata opens. 6-car trains begin operation.
1 October 1986: Through service to Ikoma commences upon the opening of the Kintetsu Keihanna Line (then named the Higashiosaka Line).

On 18 December 1997, the OTS Technoport Line opened between Ōsakakō and Cosmosquare. This line was absorbed into the Chūō Line on 1 July 2005. The Keihanna Line was extended further into Nara when the extension to Gakken Nara-Tomigaoka opened on 27 March 2006.

Future Plans 
The North Technoport Line is a planned extension of the Chūō line from Cosmosquare to Yumeshima, Maishima, and Sakurajima. The section to Yumeshima is currently under construction with a projected completion date of 2024, in advance of the Osaka 2025 Expo.

Separately, a new station is planned to be built on the spur track to the Morinomiya depot facility as part of local revitalization efforts, with a projected completion date of 2028.

Line data 
 Above-ground section: west of Ōsakakō to west of Awaza; east of Aramoto (Keihanna Line)
 Block signalling: Automatic
 Train protection system: WS-ATC
 Cars per train: 6 (1984 – present)
 Maximum possible cars per train (platform length): 8

Stations

Rolling stock

Osaka Metro
 20 series (from 1984)
 24 series (from 1991) (in green Osaka Municipal Transportation Bureau and blue Osaka Port Transport System (OTS) liveries) 

 Osaka Metro 30000A series (from July 2022)

Kintetsu Railway
 7000 series (from 1986)
 7020 series (from 2004)

The Osaka Metro trains are based at Morinomiya Depot, while the Kintetsu Railway trains are based at Higashi-Hanazono and Tomigaoka Depots located on the Keihanna Line.

Former
 800 series (1961–1978)
 900 series (1964–1978)
 30 series (1967–1969, 1983–1995)
 50 series (1969–1991)

Future
 400 series (from April 2023)

References

Osaka Metro
Standard gauge railways in Japan
Railway lines opened in 1961
Rail transport in Osaka Prefecture
750 V DC railway electrification
1961 establishments in Japan